The Australian Anarchist Centenary Celebrations were held from 1 to 4 May 1986 in Melbourne, Australia.

Preparations to celebrate the centenary of the formation of the first known anarchist organisation in Australia commenced in August 1984 by the Libertarian Workers for a Self Managed Society (L.W.S.S.) The Melbourne Anarchist Club was formed on 1 May 1886 and included David Andrade, John Arthur Andrews, Monty Miller and Chummy Fleming.

The Centenary Celebrations were used by some anarchists to rebuff the negative connotations placed on the word "anarchy".

The Centenary celebrations included a May Day march on 1 May 1986 of about 400 people, including several large puppets and many banners, and several visiting anarchists from Japan, Korea, Hong Kong, United States, England, France and Spain. Over the weekend several events occurred including banner, poster and historical displays, a two-day conference held at RMIT and Melbourne University, and a picnic in the Royal Botanic Gardens, Melbourne.

In conjunction with the conference, a two-day anarchist film festival was held featuring films such as All our lives, a history of Mujeres Libres told by the women themselves; We Aim to Please, a short Australian film on gender politics; Liberty My Love, an Italian anarchist film; Harry Hooton about an Australian poet; and Elsie: a study of a collective about a Sydney women's refuge; and many more.

After the Anarchist Centenary Celebrations, the Anarchist Media Institute was established by Dr Toscano and other Melbourne anarchists to increase the media profile of anarchists and Anarchism in Australia and correct bias and misconceptions about anarchism in the media.

Bibliography
Anarchy is Order Government is Chaos. Australian Anarchist Centenary Celebrations (Ed) Joseph Toscano & others (1988) Melbourne, No ISBN
The International Anarchist Film Festival. Melbourne 2–4 May 1986 Hilary May and Patrick Watson (Eds), Melbourne (1986)

References

1986 in Australia
History of anarchism
Anarchism in Australia
Australian historical anniversaries
1980s in Melbourne
May 1968 events in Australia